Gothic is the 22nd concept album by Nox Arcana. The album opens with an introductory narration, describing terms of an inheritance of an old gothic mansion called Grimstone Manor. The story described in narrative form and in the liner notes contains elements of danger and romance like that of a 19th-century Gothic novel. Musically, the album features Nox Arcana's brand of dark ambient music, with the use of pipe organ, violins, harpsichord, piano, choirs, and other instrumentation, representing a musical journey through the haunted mansion.

Track listing
 Testament — 2:07
 Grimstone Manor — 2:53
 Ashes To Ashes — 2:30
 Forgotten By Time — 2:53
 The Portrait Gallery — 2:48
 Into The Darkness — 3:14
 Familiar Haunts — 3:50
 The House Beyond The Graveyard — 1:01
 Unhallowed Halls — 3:02
 The Doll House — 2:31
 Melancholy Memories — 2:51
 Stir Of Shadows — 2:07
 Dark Realms — 2:30
 Beyond The Forbidden Gate — 3:07
 In The Blood — 3:05
 The Beast Within — 3:03
 The Black Crypt — 1:55
 Wake The Dead — 2:46
 The Others — 2:54
 Rise Of The Ancestors — 3:14
 Dark Surrender — 5:36
 The song "Dark Surrender" ends at 3:15. An untitled hidden track begins at 3:35.

References

External links
 Nox Arcana's official website

Nox Arcana albums
Halloween albums
2015 albums